Gaoping is a district of the city of Nanchong, Sichuan province, China.

Education

One campus of North Sichuan Medical University is in the district.

References

External links
Official website of Gaoping District

Districts of Sichuan
Nanchong